The West Bengal Film Journalists' Association Award for Best Director is given yearly by WBFJA as a part of its annual West Bengal Film Journalists' Association Awards for Bengali films, to recognize the best director of the previous year.

Superlatives

List of winners

Winner Wise

Nomination Wise 
 2017 Kaushik Ganguly – Cinemawala
 Goutam Ghose - Shankhachil
 Kamaleshwar Mukherjee - Khawto
 Shiboprosad Mukherjee, Nandita Roy - Praktan
 Srijit Mukherji - Zulfiqar

 2018 Kaushik Ganguly – Bishorjan
 Atanu Ghosh - Mayurakshi
 Pratim D. Gupta - Maacher Jhol
 Anik Dutta - Meghnad Badh Rahasya
 Mostofa Sarwar Farooki - Doob
 Suman Mukhopadhyay - Asampta
 Arindam Sil - Dhananjay
 Buddhadeb Dasgupta - Tope

 2019 Srijit Mukherji - Ek Je Chhilo Raja
 Arnab Riingo Banerjee - Ray
 Ranjan Ghosh - Rongberonger Korhi
 Soukarya Ghosal - Rainbow Jelly
 Indrasis Acharya - Pupa
 Mainak Bhaumik - Generation Ami
 Arindam Sil - Byomkesh Gotro

 2020 Kaushik Ganguly – Nagarkirtan
 Srijit Mukherji - Vinci Da
 Aparna Sen -  Ghawre Bairey Aaj
 Buddhadeb Dasgupta - Urojahaj
 Dhrubo Banerjee - Durgeshgorer Guptodhon
 Churni Ganguly - Tarikh
2021 Anik Dutta - Barunbabur Bondhu
Srijit Mukherjee - Dwitiyo Purush
Sudeshna Roy & Abhijit Guha -  Sraboner Dhara
Debaloy Bhattacharya - Dracula Sir
Mainak Bhaumik -  Cheeni
2022 Atanu Ghosh -  Binisutoy
Bratya Basu - Dictionary
Dhrubo Banerjee - GolondaajGolondaaj
Saibal Mitra - Tokhon Kuasa Chilo
Kamaleshwar Mukherjee - Anusondhaan

See also
 West Bengal Film Journalists' Association Awards
 Cinema of India

References

Bengal film awards